Buram is a district of South Darfur state, Sudan.

References

Districts of Sudan